Seven Hills is Japanese heavy metal band Anthem's second studio album since their reformation in the year 2000.

Track listing 
 "Grieve of Heart" (Shibata) - 4:13
 "Raging Twister" (Sakamoto, Shibata) - 4:17
 "XTC" (Shibata) - 4:35
 "The Man with No Name" (Shibata) - 4:46
 "March to the Madness" (Sakamoto, Shibata) - 5:08
 "D.I.M. 422" (Shimizu) - 3:21
 "Running Blood" (Sakamoto, Shibata) - 5:39
 "Freedom" (Shibata) - 4:38
 "Silently and Perfectly" (Shibata) - 5:58
 "The Innocent Man" (Shibata) - 4:44

Personnel

Band members
Eizo Sakamoto - vocals
Akio Shimizu - guitars
Naoto Shibata - bass, producer
Hirotsugu Homma - drums

Production
Dan McClendon - engineer, mixing
Andy Martin - assistant engineer
George Azuma - supervisor

References

2001 albums
Anthem (band) albums
Victor Entertainment albums